The Pinguin was a German auxiliary cruiser (Hilfskreuzer) which served as a commerce raider in World War II. The Pinguin was known to the Kriegsmarine as Schiff 33, and designated HSK 5.  The most successful commerce raider of the war, she was known to the British Royal Navy as Raider F. The name Pinguin means penguin in German.

Early history
Formerly a freighter named Kandelfels,  she was built by  AG Weser in 1936, and was owned and operated by the Hansa Line, Bremen. In the winter of 1939/40, she was requisitioned by the Kriegsmarine (KM) and converted to a war ship by DeSchiMAG, Bremen. Her main armament was taken from the obsolete battleship .

Raider voyage
Pinguin was one of the first wave of raiders sent out by the Kriegsmarine, sailing on 15 June 1940 under the command of Fregattenkapitän (later Kapitän zur See) Ernst-Felix Krüder.

Slipping through the Denmark Straits, Pinguin made for her patrol area in the Southern Ocean.

In 10½ months at sea she accounted for 28 ships, totalling 136,000 tons (GRT).

Her most successful coup was the capture, on 14 January 1941, of most of the Norwegian whaling fleet in Antarctica, totalling three factory ships and 11 whalers.
These were sent back as prizes to Europe, arriving in Bordeaux, occupied France in March 1941. One of the whalers was retained as an auxiliary raider and re-named Adjutant.

Adjutant went on to lay mines around New Zealand waters.

Fate
On 8 May 1941, Pinguin was sunk in a battle with the British heavy cruiser . She was the first auxiliary cruiser of the Kriegsmarine to be sunk in the war. 532 lives, among them 200 prisoners, were lost when Pinguin blew apart when the mines stored on board took a hit and exploded. Cornwall rescued 60 crew members and 22 prisoners who were originally crew of the 28 merchant ships the raider had either sunk or captured.

Notes

References

Bibliography

 
 
 
 
 
 
 Ivanov, Lyubomir and Ivanova, Nusha. Whaling period. In: The World of Antarctica. Generis Publishing, 2022. pp. 91–94.

External links
 The Royal New Zealand Navy Official History describes the operations of Pinguin

External links
 www.bismarck-class.dk
 DreadnoughtProject.org original plan images of the vessel.
 German Commerce Raider HK33 (Battle LIne series) Part 1 of 3
 German Commerce Raider HK33 (Battle LIne series) Part 2 of 3
 Norwegian Victims of Pinguin
 Marauders of the Sea, German Armed Merchant Ships During W.W. 2
 Cruise Of The Raider HK 33
 Operations of the Pinguin
 Cruises Of The Secret Raiders.

1936 ships
Auxiliary cruisers of the Kriegsmarine
Maritime incidents in May 1941
Ships built in Bremen (state)
World War II commerce raiders
World War II cruisers of Germany
World War II shipwrecks in the Indian Ocean
Naval magazine explosions